The James Schofield House is a historic Second Empire house at 3 Mt. Pleasant Street in Worcester, Massachusetts.  It was built sometime before 1860, making it an early example of the style.  It is a basically square structure, 2.5 stories high.  At the time of its listing on the National Register of Historic Places in 1980,  it featured an entry porch with turned pillars, and quoins on the corners of the house, but these have been removed or covered over by subsequent replacement of the siding (see photo).

See also
National Register of Historic Places listings in southwestern Worcester, Massachusetts
National Register of Historic Places listings in Worcester County, Massachusetts

References

Houses in Worcester, Massachusetts
Second Empire architecture in Massachusetts
Houses completed in 1860
National Register of Historic Places in Worcester, Massachusetts
Houses on the National Register of Historic Places in Worcester County, Massachusetts